Apopka (YTB-778) was a United States Navy  named for Apopka, Florida.

Construction

The contract for Apopka was awarded 31 January 1964. She was laid down on 15 October 1964 at Marinette, Wisconsin by Marinette Marine and launched 8 July 1965.

Operational history

Upon entering into service, Apopka was assigned to the Atlantic Fleet. By the beginning of 1966, she had crossed the Atlantic Ocean and had begun operations at SUBRON 14, Holy Loch, Scotland. When FBM Refit Site One at Holy Loch closed in 1992, Apopka was transferred to Guantanamo Bay Naval Base.

Stricken from the Navy List 26 June 1996, ex-Apopka was transferred the Maritime Administration to be used at the James River Reserve Fleet.

References

External links

 

Natick-class large harbor tugs
1965 ships
Ships built by Marinette Marine